Ruben Tamati Love (born 28 April 2001) is a New Zealand rugby union player who plays for  in the Bunnings NPC and the  in Super Rugby. His playing position is fullback but he has also featured at first five-eighth.

Career 
Love made his debut for Wellington on 25 September 2020 in a game against Bay of Plenty, scoring a try in the 32–10 victory.

References

External links

2001 births
New Zealand rugby union players
Living people
Rugby union centres
Wellington rugby union players
Rugby union fly-halves
Rugby union fullbacks
Hurricanes (rugby union) players
Rugby union players from Wellington City